Taiyuannan (Taiyuan South) railway station ( is a railway station in Xiaodian District, Taiyuan, Shanxi, China. It opened on July 1, 2014, together with the Datong–Xi'an Passenger Railway.

See also
Taiyuan railway station

Railway stations in Shanxi
Railway stations in China opened in 2014